No. 215 Squadron RAF was a Royal Air Force aircraft squadron formed as a night bomber squadron in the First and Second World Wars, becoming a transport squadron near the end of the Second World War.

History
First World War
No. 215 Squadron was formed in France on 1 April 1918 by renumbering No. 15 Squadron of the Royal Naval Air Service. No. 15 Squadron RNAS had been formed on 10 March 1918 to operate the Handley Page 0/100 as a night bomber squadron against targets in Germany. Soon after the squadron became part of the Royal Air Force it returned to England to re-equip with the Handley Page O/400 before returning to France as part of the Independent Air Force. After World War I hostilities ended (November 1918), the squadron disbanded on 18 October 1919.

1935
The squadron was re-formed and dissolved in late 1935. On 1 October, it was formed out of 'A' Flight, No. 58 Squadron at RAF Worthy Down, but was merged soon afterwards into 11 OTU. That same day, the squadron was officially re-formed at RAF Honington, as a Vickers Wellington unit, but the new squadron was again merged into 11 OTU.

 Second World War
Following the outbreak of war with Japan, the squadron was re-formed as a bomber unit in December 1941, at RAF Newmarket. Equipped with Wellingtons, it was posted to Calcutta in 1942 and was involved in bombing operations. 215 Squadron was later re-equipped with Consolidated Liberator aircraft. During this period, it included a significant proportion of aircrews from other Commonwealth countries, many of whom were Royal Australian Air Force (RAAF) personnel. The squadron suffered significant losses of personnel and aircraft on operations over Burma.  

In April 1945 it assumed a transport role and was re-equipped with Douglas Dakotas. While the squadron was officially disbanded on 15 February 1946, it was redesignated the same day as No. 48 Squadron.

1947–48
The squadron was formed again on 1 August 1947 at RAF Kabrit in Egypt with the Douglas Dakota for transport duties and was disbanded on 1 May 1948 when it was re-numbered as No. 70 Squadron.

1956–58
The squadron was reformed in April 1956 at RAF Dishforth to operate the Scottish Aviation Pioneer in the light transport role and Army support duties, and was disbanded two years later in September 1958 when it was re-designated No. 230 Squadron.

1963–67
The squadron was again formed in May 1963 at RAF Benson as a medium-range transport squadron for operation in the Far East and it moved to RAF Changi with the Armstrong Whitworth Argosy until it was disbanded in December 1967.

Aircraft operated

References

Citations

Bibliography

External links

215
Military of Hong Kong under British rule